Kozki is a rural locality (a khutor) in Markovskoye Rural Settlement, Kamensky District, Voronezh Oblast, Russia. The population was 106 as of 2010.

Geography 
Kozki is located 28 km northeast of Kamenka (the district's administrative centre) by road. Marki is the nearest rural locality.

References 

Rural localities in Kamensky District, Voronezh Oblast